Asceticists 2006 is the eighteenth studio album by power electronics group Whitehouse, released in 2006 through Susan Lawly. It was reissued on vinyl format through Very Friendly in October 2008.

Track listing

Personnel
William Bennett - vocals, synthesizers, production
Philip Best - vocals, synthesizers
Denis Blackham - mastering

References

External links
 

2006 albums
Whitehouse (band) albums